This is a list of universities in São Tomé and Príncipe.

 University of São Tomé and Príncipe
 Universidade Lusíada de São Tomé e Príncipe

References 

São Tomé and Príncipe-related lists
Sao Tome And Principe
Sao Tome And Principe